Pronovost is a surname. Notable people with the surname include:

André Pronovost (born 1936), Canadian ice hockey player
Claude Pronovost (born 1935), Canadian ice hockey player
Denis Pronovost (born 1953), Canadian politician
Jean Pronovost (born 1945), Canadian ice hockey player
Marcel Pronovost (1930–2015), Canadian ice hockey player and coach
Mike Pronovost (born 1989), American Internet entrepreneur
Peter Pronovost (born 1965), American anesthesiologist